Milton Speer "Mit" Simms, son of Maria Louisa Speer and Franklin Robert Simms, was born in Rockford, Alabama in 1873 and grew up there. He moved to Arizona Territory sometime before 1902. On December 25, 1902, he married his first wife, Lillian Mary McCabe (1881–1941). No children emerged from this marriage. 

On September 12, 1910, he was elected Graham County Delegate to the Arizona Constitutional Convention. There, on December 9, 1910, he signed the Constitution of Arizona. He served as the 2nd Treasurer of Arizona for four non-consecutive terms from 1915 to 1917, from 1931 to 1933, from 1935 to 1937, and lastly from 1947 to 1949. He also served as the 2nd Secretary of State of Arizona from 1919 to 1921. He then served on the Arizona Corporation Commission from 1949 to 1954, and again from 1955 to 1957. 

Simms failed runs include one for governor in 1920, where he lost to incumbent governor Thomas Edward Campbell in a nationally Republican year. He also ran for secretary of state in 1936 and 1938, but lost in the Democratic primary both times, first narrowly to incumbent James H. Kerby, and the second time to fellow Treasurer Harry M. Moore. Simm also ran for treasurer in 1942, but lost in the primary to James D. "Jim" Brush in a four-way race, narrowly coming in second.

Throughout his life he was a dry goods salesman, a Graham County recorder, a farmer, and a rancher.

On May 15, 1946, Simms married Sarah Loella Wright. Their marriage lasted until his death. She lived until August 23, 1969.

He died on July 22, 1957, at St. Joseph's Hospital in Phoenix, Arizona. His body was buried on July 25, 1958, in the Safford Union Cemetery in Safford (Graham County).

References

Literature 
 Goff, John S.: George W. P. Hunt and His Arizona, Socio Technical Publications, 1973, S. 279
 State of Arizona Department of State Annual Fiscal Year Report 2014, S. 8

External links 
 Mit Simms from the website The Political Graveyard
 Mit Simms from the website Our Campaigns
 Arizona Secretary of State – Mit Simms

1873 births
1957 deaths
People from Coosa County, Alabama
Arizona Democrats
State cabinet secretaries of Arizona
Politicians from Phoenix, Arizona
20th-century American politicians
State treasurers of Arizona
Secretaries of State of Arizona